Kenya competed at the 2015 World Championships in Athletics in Beijing, China, from 22–30 August 2015.  Selection came from the 2015 Athletics Kenya World Championship Trials.

Medalists 
The following competitors from Kenya won medals at the Championships

Results
(q – qualified, NM – no mark, SB – season best)

Men
Track and road events

Field events

Women 
Track and road events

Sources 
Kenyan team

Nations at the 2015 World Championships in Athletics
World Championships in Athletics
Kenya at the World Championships in Athletics